The Substation Fire was a wildfire in the U.S. state of Oregon near The Dalles. The fire was first reported on July 17, 2018, and had burned .

Incidents

The Substation Fire was reported, burning on private land, in the late afternoon on July 17, 2018, five miles south of The Dalles, two miles west of Moro and near the border of Grass Valley. Strong winds caused the fire to grow rapidly, with the fire moving over 18 miles in days. Agricultural and recreational areas suffered heavy damage and by July 18 Oregon Governor Kate Brown had declared a state of emergency, which included calling the Oregon National Guard to assist with fighting the fire and the communities of Moro, Grass Valley and Kent were evacuated. The next day, evacuation orders were lifted, however a temporary flight restriction was put in place in the area.

As of July 23, the fire had destroyed  and was 92 percent contained.

References

External links

 

2018 Oregon wildfires
July 2018 events in the United States